Av8er Limited was a British aircraft manufacturer based in Woodford Halse, Northamptonshire and founded by Paul Taylor. The company specialized in the design and manufacture of paramotors in the form of ready-to-fly aircraft for the US FAR 103 Ultralight Vehicles and European rules.

The company was founded in 1996. The company continues as an information technology firm, supplying data centre services, related equipment and aerial photography services using UAVs, computer servers, media platforms, instructional videos and off-road vehicle engines and parts.

In the aircraft production years Av8er manufactured a range of paramotors noted for their lightness and attention to detail, in particular balancing and vibration isolating features. The models included the Explorer, Orbiter, Observer and Titan.

Aircraft

References

External links

Company paramotoring website archives, 2001–11 on the Internet Archive
Company paramotoring website archives on the Internet Archive
	 

1996 establishments in England
Companies based in Northamptonshire
Defunct aircraft manufacturers of England
Paramotors
Ultralight aircraft